Ceromitia ochrodyta is a species of moth of the Adelidae family or fairy longhorn moths. It was described by Edward Meyrick in 1922. It is found in Brazil.

References

Moths described in 1922
Adelidae
Endemic fauna of Brazil
Moths of South America